Pōnui Nunatak is a nunatak located  southeast of Slattery Peak and  southwest of The Knoll in southeast Ross Island. The feature rises to  near the juncture of the island and the Ross Ice Shelf. The name Pōnui (meaning "south wind") is one of several Māori-language wind names applied by the New Zealand Geographic Board in this vicinity.

References

Nunataks of Ross Island